Gorka Pérez Garay (born 19 June 1995) is a Spanish professional footballer who plays as either a central defender or a defensive midfielder for Badajoz.

Club career
Born in Gordexola, Biscay, Basque Country, Pérez finished his formation with Barakaldo CF. In 2014 he joined Athletic Bilbao, being assigned to the farm team in Tercera División and making his senior debut during the season; a defensive midfielder, he was also converted to a central defender during his spell at the side.

On 20 August 2015, shortly after being promoted to the reserves, Pérez was loaned to Segunda División B side Gernika Club, for one year. Upon returning, he was assigned back at the B-team, now also in the third division.

On 27 May 2019, Athletic announced Pérez's departure from the club. He signed for UD Logroñés still in the third division on 1 July, and helped the club achieve a first-ever promotion to Segunda División at the end of the season.

Pérez made his professional debut on 12 September 2020, starting in a 0–1 away loss against Sporting de Gijón.

On 26 July 2021, he joined to Primera División RFEF club Badajoz. On 2 october 2021, Pérez scored two goals against Cultural Leonesa.

References

External links

1995 births
Living people
Sportspeople from Biscay
Spanish footballers
Footballers from the Basque Country (autonomous community)
Association football defenders
Association football midfielders
Segunda División players
Segunda División B players
Primera Federación players
Tercera División players
CD Basconia footballers
Bilbao Athletic footballers
Gernika Club footballers
UD Logroñés players
CD Badajoz players